Huusko is a Finnish surname. Notable people with the surname include:

Ellinor Huusko (born 1996), Swedish racing cyclist
Keijo Huusko (born 1980), Finnish footballer

Finnish-language surnames